The Computer Connection is a science fiction novel by American writer Alfred Bester. Originally published as a serial in Analog Science Fiction (November, December 1974, January 1975, under the title The Indian Giver), it appeared in book form in 1975. Some editions give it the title Extro. The novel was nominated for the Nebula Award for Best Novel in 1975 and the Hugo Award for Best Novel in 1976.

Plot introduction
In the future, a band of immortals (some who are famous historical characters, some who have tried their best to avoid becoming so), including Herb Wells, Ned Curzon (nicknamed Grand Guignol), Hillel, and Sam Pepys have only one requirement for membership: don't die.  Through their extensive social network, they come across a brilliant Cherokee physicist named Sequoya Guess, who himself has only very recently learned of his peculiarity and the catches and loopholes that come along with it. This creates a swift change in Guess's day-to-day life that is as much a shock to his friends as to himself.  At the same time, the world's scientists are collaborating to bring together a supercomputer named Extro that will monitor and control all mechanical activity on Earth.  The immortals create a plan to subtly harness Extro to aid them in their quest for knowledge and use some of the experience they have gained to assist it in its task.  Working outside of expected behavior, Extro instead seizes control of Dr. Guess, leaving the only people who know what is going on—the Immortals and Guess's nearest friends—to grapple with the heart and mind of a malevolent machine in the body of an Immortal, a powerful and ingenious man who cannot be killed.

Reception
New York Times reviewer Gerald Jonas reported that Bester tried, but failed, "to make arbitrariness a virtue" in The Computer Connection, concluding that the novel "cannot possibly be as much fun" for the reader as it was for the writer. Arthur D. Hlavaty, a former editor of The New York Review of Science Fiction, wrote that the book gave "an unintentional example of his own theme of the unrecoverability of the past. His long-awaited novel, variously called The Indian Giver, Extro, and The Computer Connection, was a major disappointment—a confused farrago of old ideas and gimmicks." Patrick A. McCarthy, in a review of Carolyn Wendell's 1982 Alfred Bester, wrote that her coverage of The Computer Connection is "very brief but quite accurate in calling attention to this novel's many shortcomings."

References

External links
 

1975 American novels
1975 science fiction novels
American science fiction novels
Berkley Books books
Novels by Alfred Bester
Novels first published in serial form
Works originally published in Analog Science Fiction and Fact